Guillaume Coelho (born March 19, 1986 in Le Puy-en-Velay) is a French professional football player. Currently, he plays in the Championnat National 2 for Le Puy Foot 43 Auvergne.

He played at the professional level in Ligue 2 for LB Châteauroux.

See also
Football in France
List of football clubs in France

References

External links

1986 births
Living people
French footballers
Ligue 2 players
LB Châteauroux players
Thonon Evian Grand Genève F.C. players
US Orléans players
Association football defenders
People from Le Puy-en-Velay
Sportspeople from Haute-Loire
Footballers from Auvergne-Rhône-Alpes